Lumi River may refer to:

 Lumi River (East Africa), river in Tanzania and Kenya
 Lumi River (Zambia), river in Zambia

See also 
 Lumi (disambiguation)